Steeplebush is a common name for several plants and may refer to:

Spiraea douglasii, native to western North America
Spiraea tomentosa, native to eastern North America